On Black Deforestation Fields is a Belarusian drama film based on two short stories by Vasil Bykau, On Black Deforestation Fields and Before the End.

Plot
A group of Belarusian anti-Soviet insurgents from the failed Slutsk Defence Action wanders through forests, fleeing the from the surrounding Bolshevik army. To escape captivity or death in battle with a subsequent identification of their bodies and retaliation against their families, the insurgents decide to commit group suicide in a place hidden from the Bolsheviks. Only the youngest of the insurgents is let to bury the others' bodies and live on.

Production and distribution
The premiere of the movie was scheduled for soon after the controversial referendum held by the authoritarian pro-Russian president Aliaksandr Lukashenka, but never took place as the only copy of the film had allegedly been stolen before the event. The copy was later found again.

According to media, the film was banned by Lukashenka's chief ideologist of that time, Vladimir Zametalin. Valery Ponomaryov, the film's director, was banned from further work in the film industry. The movie has been distributed illegally through VHS and DVD in Belarus and abroad.On Black Ice'' was allegedly invited to participate in several international film festivals but Belarusfilm as the official right holder did not respond to the invitations.

See also
 Censorship in Belarus

References

External links
 
 Full movie on the official YouTube channel of Belarusfilm

Censorship in Belarus
Films set in Belarus
Belarusian-language films
Belarusfilm films
Films set in the 1920s
European war films
Russian Civil War films
Films critical of communism